Nottingham East is a constituency represented in the House of Commons of the UK Parliament since 2019 by Nadia Whittome of the Labour Party.

Members of Parliament

Constituency profile
On average earners' incomes are slightly lower than the national average and in 2010 unemployment stood at 7.4%, which was higher than the East Midlands average at the time of 3.6% however the picture is not uniform across all 2011 Census Output Areas, some of which have incomes at the national average or above and together with the affordability of property in the area, those on the national average way or above generally have the ability to save, purchase property or enjoy a high standard of living.

Boundaries

The constituency covers the north-eastern part of the City of Nottingham. It includes the suburbs of Mapperley, Carrington and Sherwood, and the inner city areas of Hyson Green, St Ann's, Bakersfield and Sneinton.

2010–present: The City of Nottingham wards of Arboretum, Berridge, Dales, Mapperley, St Ann's, and Sherwood.

1983–2010: The City of Nottingham wards of Basford, Forest, Greenwood, Manvers, Mapperley, Radford, St Ann's, Sherwood, and Trent.

1974–1983: The County Borough of Nottingham wards of Bridge, Lenton, Manvers, Market, St Ann's, and Trent.

1950–1955: The County Borough of Nottingham wards of Byron, Manvers, Mapperley, and St Ann's.

1918–1950: The County Borough of Nottingham wards of Byron, Manvers, Mapperley, and St Mary's.

1885–1918: The Borough of Nottingham wards of Byron, Manvers, Mapperley, Robin Hood, and St Ann's.

History
The present Nottingham East constituency was created in 1974, and first elected Jack Dunnett who had been Labour MP for the abolished Nottingham Central seat. Michael Knowles regained it for the Conservative Party in 1983, when some of the seat was transferred to the new Nottingham South constituency in boundary changes. Knowles held the seat with a reduced majority in 1987, but John Heppell gained it for Labour in 1992, and held the seat until he retired in 2010. Until 2019 it was held by Chris Leslie, initially for Labour Co-operative and later for Change UK. Leslie previously represented his hometown constituency of Shipley in West Yorkshire, from 1997 until losing his seat to Philip Davies in 2005. During his first term he joined the front benches serving as a junior minister as part of the Tony Blair Government and was briefly Shadow Chancellor after the 2015 general election. The incumbent MP, Nadia Whittome, is the current Baby of the House, aged 23 upon her election in 2019.

Elections

Elections in the 2010s

Elections in the 2000s

Elections in the 1990s

Elections in the 1980s

Elections in the 1970s

Elections in the 1950s

Elections in the 1940s 

General Election 1939–40:
Another general election was required to take place before the end of 1940. The political parties had been making preparations for an election to take place from 1939 and by the end of this year, the following candidates had been selected; 
 Conservative: Louis Gluckstein 
 Labour: George Twells

Elections in the 1930s

Elections in the 1920s

Elections in the 1910s 

General Election 1914–15:
Another General Election was required to take place before the end of 1915. The political parties had been making preparations for an election to take place and by July 1914, the following candidates had been selected; 
Unionist: John Rees
Labour: Thomas Proctor

Elections in the 1900s

Elections in the 1890s 

 Morley was appointed Postmaster General, requiring a by-election.

Elections in the 1880s

See also
 List of parliamentary constituencies in Nottinghamshire

Notes

References

Politics of Nottingham
Parliamentary constituencies in Nottinghamshire
Constituencies of the Parliament of the United Kingdom established in 1885
Constituencies of the Parliament of the United Kingdom disestablished in 1955
Constituencies of the Parliament of the United Kingdom established in 1974